is a Japanese footballer who plays as a goalkeeper for  club FC Tokyo.

Career statistics

Club

References

External links

2001 births
Living people
Japanese footballers
Japan youth international footballers
Association football goalkeepers
FC Tokyo players
FC Tokyo U-23 players
Iwate Grulla Morioka players
J1 League players
J2 League players
J3 League players